The Pitchfork Music Festival 2014 was held on July 18 to 19, 2014 at the Union Park, Chicago, United States. The festival was headlined by Beck, Kendrick Lamar and Neutral Milk Hotel. English rock band Slowdive made their first concert in North America in over twenty years. American band The Julie Ruin cancelled their appearance after frontwoman Kathleen Hanna suffered from Lyme disease.

Lineup
Headline performers are listed in boldface. Artists listed from latest to earliest set times.

Notes

References

External links

2014 music festivals
Pitchfork Music Festival